Wim van Til (born 24 September 1953) is a Dutch former footballer who was active as a midfielder. Van Til made his professional debut at Feijenoord and also played for FC Dordrecht, Excelsior Rotterdam and Heracles Almelo.

Honours
 1973–74 : Eredivisie winner with Feyenoord
 1983–84 : Eredivisie winner with Feyenoord
 1983–84 : KNVB Cup winner with Feyenoord

References

 Profile

1953 births
Living people
Dutch footballers
Feyenoord players
FC Dordrecht players
Excelsior Rotterdam players
Heracles Almelo players
Association football midfielders
Footballers from Rotterdam
Eredivisie players